The Old Tampa Children's Home (also known as the Good Samaritan Inn) is a historic home in Tampa, Florida. Some sources have it located at 3302 North Tampa Avenue but this is incorrect. It is actually one block east on Florida Avenue. On July 22, 1999, it was added to the U.S. National Register of Historic Places.

References

External links
 Hillsborough County listings at National Register of Historic Places
 Hillsborough County listings at Florida's Office of Cultural and Historical Programs

Buildings and structures in Tampa, Florida
National Register of Historic Places in Tampa, Florida